Roberts County is the name of two counties in the United States:

 Roberts County, South Dakota
 Roberts County, Texas